Madison Township is one of thirteen townships in Butler County, Ohio, United States. Located in northeastern Butler County, just west of Middletown, it had a population of 8,556 people as of the 2020 census. While it surrounds the city of Trenton, the city is no longer part of the township. It is named for James Madison, president of the United States at the time of its creation in 1810, and is one of twenty Madison Townships statewide.

Geography
The township is in what is commonly known as the Congress Lands, that part of Ohio surveyed under the regular U.S. government survey. It originally consisted of 32 whole and 19 fractional sections.

Located in the northeastern corner of the county, it borders the following townships:
German Township, Montgomery County - north
Franklin Township, Warren County - east
Lemon Township - southeast
Liberty Township - south
Fairfield Township - southwest, south of St. Clair Township
St. Clair Township - southwest, north of Fairfield Township
Wayne Township - west
Gratis Township, Preble County - northwest

It is the only county township to border Montgomery County.

Within Madison Township are located several unincorporated communities:
Poasttown, in the northeastern part of the township
West Middletown, in the eastern part of the township
Woodsdale, on the border with St. Clair Township in the township's far south

History
The township, the ninth in order of creation, was erected from Lemon Township by the Butler County Commissioners on May 7, 1810, following a petition by residents of the district.

The first election for township officers was on May 19, 1810.

Government
The township is governed by a three-member board of trustees, who are elected in November of odd-numbered years to a four-year term beginning on the following January 1.  Two are elected in the year after the presidential election and one is elected in the year before it.  There is also an elected township fiscal officer, who serves a four-year term beginning on April 1 of the year after the election, which is held in November of the year before the presidential election.  Vacancies in the fiscal officership or on the board of trustees are filled by the remaining trustees.

Public services
The major roads are State Routes 4 (a main road from Cincinnati to Dayton via Middletown), 122 (which links Lebanon to Middletown), and 744.

The township is in the Madison Local School District and the Edgewood Local School District.

References

Bert S. Barlow, W.H. Todhunter, Stephen D. Cone, Joseph J. Pater, and Frederick Schneider, eds.  Centennial History of Butler County, Ohio.  Hamilton, Ohio:  B.F. Bowen, 1905.
Jim Blount.  The 1900s:  100 Years In the History of Butler County, Ohio.  Hamilton, Ohio:  Past Present Press, 2000.
Butler County Engineer's Office.  Butler County Official Transportation Map, 2003.  Fairfield Township, Butler County, Ohio:  The Office, 2003.
A History and Biographical Cyclopaedia of Butler County, Ohio with Illustrations and Sketches of Its Representative Men and Pioneers.  Cincinnati, Ohio:  Western Biographical Publishing Company, 1882. 
Ohio. Secretary of State.  The Ohio municipal and township roster, 2002-2003.  Columbus, Ohio:  The Secretary, 2003.

External links
Township website
County website

Townships in Butler County, Ohio
1810 establishments in Ohio
Populated places established in 1810
Townships in Ohio